The 1990 State of the Union Address was given by the 41st president of the United States, George H. W. Bush, on January 31, 1990, at 9:00 p.m. EST, in the chamber of the United States House of Representatives to the 101st United States Congress. It was Bush's first State of the Union Address and his second speech to a joint session of the United States Congress. Presiding over this joint session was the House speaker, Tom Foley, accompanied by Dan Quayle, the vice president, in his capacity as the president of the Senate.

The speech lasted 35 minutes and 43 seconds. and contained 3,777 words.

The Democratic Party response was delivered by House Speaker Tom Foley of Washington.

Edward J. Derwinski, the Secretary of Veterans Affairs, served as the designated survivor.

See also
United States House of Representatives elections, 1990

References

External links
 (full transcript), The American Presidency Project, UC Santa Barbara.
 1990 State of the Union Address (video) at C-SPAN
 Full video and audio, Miller Center of Public Affairs, University of Virginia.

State of the Union addresses
State union 1990
101st United States Congress
State of the Union Address
State of the Union Address
State of the Union Address
State of the Union Address
January 1990 events in the United States